Brian William James (born 21 October 1982) is a former Zimbabwean cricketer. A left-handed batsman and right-arm medium pace bowler, he played three first-class matches for Manicaland between 2000 and 2001.

References

External links
 
 

1982 births
Living people
Cricketers from Mutare
Manicaland cricketers
Zimbabwean cricketers